The Embassy of the State of Palestine in Libya is the diplomatic mission of the Palestine in Libya. It is located in Ben Achour area in Tripoli.

See also

 List of diplomatic missions in Libya
 List of diplomatic missions of Palestine

References

Diplomatic missions of the State of Palestine
Diplomatic missions in Libya
Libya–State of Palestine relations